Dušan Nikolić (Serbian Cyrillic: Душан Николић; 23 January 1953 – 15 December 2018) was a Yugoslav footballer.

References

1953 births
2018 deaths
Red Star Belgrade footballers
Bolton Wanderers F.C. players
FK Teteks players
OFK Beograd players
Yugoslav First League players

Association football midfielders
Yugoslav footballers
Yugoslavia international footballers
Yugoslav expatriate footballers
Expatriate footballers in England